Fotbal Club Sheriff, commonly known as FC Sheriff Tiraspol, is an association football club based in Tiraspol, Moldova. The club was founded in 1996 as Tiras Tiraspol and was selected to participate in the Moldovan "B" Division the same year. In their debut season they were champions of the "B" Division's South group achieving promotion to the "A" Division. In April 1997 the company Sheriff became the team's general sponsor giving the club its current name. FC Sheriff were champions of the "A" Division at the first attempt, achieving successive titles and promotion to the Moldovan National Division. They were not as successful in the Moldovan Cup as they were eliminated in the first round.

FC Sheriff finished fourth in their first National Division season which is currently their lowest top-flight finish. They won the 1999 cup final, by doing so Sheriff qualified for the 1999–2000 qualifying round for the UEFA Cup. FC Sheriff's first European opponents were Czech side SK Sigma Olomouc, a 1–1 draw at home and 0–0 away meant Sigma Olomouc progressed on the away goals rule. Sheriff finished the 1999–2000 season as runners-up in the league and quarter-finalist in the cup. The 2000–01 season was the beginning of FC Sheriff's dominance of the National Division, they won both the league and the cup to achieve their first double. FC Sheriff won the National Division championship in the next nine seasons, winning the 2006–07 season undefeated. During the nine seasons they also won the cup five times and qualified for the qualifying rounds of the UEFA Champions League each season.

The 2010–11 Moldovan National Division was won by FC Dacia Chișinău with Sheriff finishing in second place and qualifying for the Europa League qualifying phase. FC Sheriff won the next three league titles with no cup wins. FC Sheriff finished the 2014–15 Moldovan National Division in third place behind Milsami Orhei and Dacia Chișinău but won the cup thus still qualifying for the Europa League qualifying rounds. FC Sheriff resumed their dominance with three more league titles and a cup win.

The Moldovan Super Cup, a match between the winners of the National Division and the winners of the Moldovan Cup, was introduced in the 2003–04 season and is played at the beginning of each season. If one team has won both competitions it is not played, this has happened in four seasons and each time it is FC Sheriff who has won the double. Of the ten Super Cups played, FC Sheriff have won seven, been runners-up twice and did not qualify for the 2011 edition.

Key

Key to competitions
 National = Moldovan National Division
 "A" = Moldovan "A" Division
 "B" (South) = Moldovan "B" Division (South group)
 UCL = UEFA Champions League
 UEL = UEFA Europa League
 UC = UEFA Cup

Key to positions and symbols
  = Champions
  = Runners-up
  = Third place
  = Promoted

Key to rounds (Europe)
QR = Qualifying round
QR1 = First qualifying round, etc.
PO = Play-off round
GS = Group stage

Seasons

See also
 Moldovan football clubs in European competitions

Notes

References
General
 
 

Specific

Seasons
 
Moldovan football club seasons